Leeds City Council is the local authority of the City of Leeds in West Yorkshire, England. It is a metropolitan district council, one of five in West Yorkshire and one of 36 in the metropolitan counties of England, and provides the majority of local government services in Leeds. It has the second-largest population of any council in the United Kingdom with approximately 800,000 inhabitants living within its area; only Birmingham City Council has more. Since 1 April 2014, it has been a constituent council of the West Yorkshire Combined Authority.

History

Leeds Corporation 
Leeds (often spelt Leedes) was a manor and then a town, receiving a charter from King Charles I as a 'Free Borough' in 1626 giving it powers of self-government, leading to the formation of the Leeds Corporation to administer it. The leader was an alderman, the first holder being Sir John Savile. A second charter, in 1661 from King Charles II, granted the title Mayor to Thomas Danby, The Corporation continued until 1835 when the Municipal Corporation Act was passed dissolving this and other town corporations and giving a new governance and electoral structure. In 1893 Leeds became a city and in 1897 the leader became Lord Mayor.

Leeds City Council 
The modern city council was established in 1974, with the first elections being held in advance in 1973. Under the Local Government Act 1972, the area of the County Borough of Leeds was combined with those of the Municipal Borough of Morley, the Municipal Borough of Pudsey, Aireborough Urban District, Horsforth Urban District, Otley Urban District, Garforth Urban District, Rothwell Urban District and parts of Tadcaster Rural District, Wetherby Rural District and Wharfedale Rural District from the West Riding. The new Leeds district was one of five metropolitan districts in West Yorkshire. It was granted a borough and city status to become the City of Leeds.

Until 1986 the city council was a second-tier authority, with West Yorkshire County Council providing many key services. However, the metropolitan county councils were abolished under the Local Government Act 1985 and the council took responsibility for all former County Council functions except policing, fire services and public transport which continue to be run on a joint basis by councillors from the former boroughs of West Yorkshire County Council.

Council services 
Leeds City Council is responsible for providing all statutory local authority services in Leeds, except for those it provides jointly in conjunction with other West Yorkshire Authorities. This includes education, housing, planning, transport and highways, social services, libraries, leisure and recreation, waste collection, waste disposal, environmental health and revenue collection. The council is one of the largest employers in West Yorkshire, with around 33,000 employees.

Education Leeds 
Education Leeds was set up in 2001 as a non-profit making company wholly owned by Leeds City Council to provide education support services for the council. For its first five years it operated as a public-private partnership between the Council and Capita. The senior councillors of the council's Executive Board voted in March 2010 to stop using Education Leeds to provide services from 31 March 2011, thereby effectively causing it to cease operation.

Housing 
Until 1 October 2013, Leeds City Council's housing stock was managed and operated by three Arms Length Management Organisations (ALMOs) since 2007. They were wholly owned by the Council but operated as autonomous and self-governing organisations. The ALMOs, which are arranged on a regional basis were:
East North East Homes
West North West Homes
Aire Valley Homes
As of 1 October 2013, the ALMOs returned to Leeds City Council and all management of Council housing stock became the responsibility of Housing Leeds. At this point, the ALMOs ceased to exist.

Management of more than 2000 homes in Belle Isle is carried out by Belle Isle Tenant Management Organisation, the largest tenant management organisation in the UK outside London.

Leeds Museums & Galleries

Leeds Museums & Galleries is a museum service run by Leeds City Council.

Established in 1821, it is the largest local authority-run museum service in England, with one of the larger and more significant multidisciplinary collections in the UK, looking after 1.3 million objects. The service is run and primarily funded by Leeds City Council (LCC), and plays a significant role in shaping the cultural life of the city, but as a leading museum service it has a regional and national reputation and role. In 2012 the organisation achieved Major Partner Museum status from Arts Council England, which brought significant additional funding and further national prominence and expectation.

The service has at times run major events across the City, with visitors numbering in the millions, such as the 2014-19 Legacies of War Project, which examined how Leeds was affected by the First World War, and developed teaching materials for schools.

Leeds Museums & Galleries is made up of nine different sites: Leeds Art Gallery, Leeds City Museum, Kirkstall Abbey, Abbey House Museum, Leeds Industrial Museum at Armley Mills, Thwaite Mills, Lotherton Hall, Temple Newsam and Leeds Discovery Centre.

Waste disposal and recycling
The city operates waste disposal and recycling facilities in Kirkstall, Meanwood, Middleton, Otley, Pudsey, Seacroft, Wetherby (Thorp Arch) and Yeadon.

West Yorkshire Joint Services 

West Yorkshire Joint Services provides services for the five district local authorities in West Yorkshire (Leeds, Bradford, Calderdale, Kirklees and Wakefield) in the areas of archaeology, archives, ecology, materials testing, public analyst, and trading standards.

Council structures

Overview and scrutiny 
The executive and workings of the council are overseen by six scrutiny boards. These panels involve councillors from all parties and some independent members. Scrutiny boards are able to review decisions taken by the executive or by officers of the council and to refer them for further consideration.

Regulatory 
The licensing committee of the council is drawn from councillors from all parties and is responsible for entertainment, refreshment, personal and premises licences established under the Licensing Act 2003. Three plans panels are responsible for determining planning applications which have not been delegated to officers for decision, such as large or controversial applications or those in which a councillor or officer has a personal interest.

Community committees 
Ten community committees are responsible for managing certain area-specific budgets and responsibilities, such as community centres and CCTV, in partnership with local communities. Committees also exert considerable influence over other areas of local interest such as street-cleansing and community policing.

Lord Mayor of Leeds 

The Lord Mayor of Leeds is a ceremonial, non-partisan position elected annually by and from the councillors. As well as acting as the Chair of the council, the Lord Mayor represents the City of Leeds at events within and outside the city.

The first Mayor of Leeds was Thomas Danby in 1661, and the first Lord Mayor was James Kitson in 1897.

During the mayoral year, the Lord Mayor's Charity Appeal raises funds for one or more charities of the mayor's choice.

Leadership 
The council operates a Leader and Cabinet executive as defined under Section 11 of the Local Government Act 2000. The Executive Board of the Council currently consists of eight executive members with portfolio responsibilities from the ruling Labour group, and the leaders the two biggest opposition groups (Conservative and Liberal Democrat).

Since February 2021, the Leader of the Council has been James Lewis (Labour). He succeeded Judith Blake, the first woman ever to lead the council.

Leaders and political control since 1945

Elected Mayor 

On 3 May 2012 a referendum was held to determine whether or not to replace the current leadership arrangements with a directly elected mayor.

The question that was asked in the referendum was set by central government, and was:
How would you like Leeds City Council to be run?
By a leader who is an elected councillor chosen by a vote of the other elected councillors. This is how the council is run now.
Or
By a mayor who is elected by voters. This would be a change from how the council is run now.

The proposal for an elected mayor was opposed by the leaders of the four largest groups on the Council. It was supported by Leeds Conservative MPs Stuart Andrew (Pudsey) and Alec Shelbrooke (Elmet and Rothwell).

The referendum results showed a rejection of the proposal for a directly elected mayor, with 63% (107,910) voting to keep the status quo.

Political composition 

The council is composed of 99 councillors, three for each of the city's electoral wards.

One councillor for each ward – a third of all of the total councillors – is elected at every council election, which are held in three of every four years. Each councillor is also elected to serve a four-year term. This only differs following a boundary review, where all council seats must be re-elected. The most recent full council elections were in 1980, 2004 and 2018. The latter election saw all three ward council seats up for re-election, with each of the three successful candidates in each ward awarded a unique one, two or four-year term respectively with longer terms given to the candidates with the highest number of votes.

Since the 2011 council election, the council has been run by a Labour majority administration. Between the 2004 and 2011 elections, the council's political composition meant no one party had a full majority and therefore there was no overall control. During this time, a coalition administration between the Conservatives and Liberal Democrats was formally agreed. Throughout the coalition, both parties' Group Leaders jointly shared the office of Leader of the Council, each holding it for six months in turn. However, in 2010, the Labour Group regained control as a minority administration with the support of the two Green Party councillors.

Electoral wards 
Leeds City Council's 33 electoral wards have been fully reviewed twice since 2000, once before the 2004 council election and again before the 2018 council election.

Beforehand, the ward boundaries had not been amended since the last review in 1979. The 1979 review increased the number of wards in Leeds from 32 to 33, thereby increasing the number of councillors from 96 to 99. The 1980 council election was the first to be contested based on the new ward boundaries across the city and therefore it was a full council, all-out election where all of the 99 council seats were up for election.

The boundary review between February 2002 and July 2003 was completed by the Boundary Committee for England. The review recommended the retention of 99 councillors representing 33 wards across the city, but suggested substantial alterations to ward boundaries to reduce the level of variance between different wards. Prior to the boundary review, based on the 2001 electorate, the largest and smallest wards respectively were Morley South (22,167 electors) and Hunslet (10,955 electors). Following the review all wards had an electorate within 10% of the average of all 33 wards across the city.

A similar process was completed in November 2017 by the Boundary Committee's successor, the Local Government Boundary Commission for England. The process had held consultations since July 2016. The biggest ward boundary changes saw the creation of two new wards in Headingley & Hyde Park and Little London and Woodhouse from the previous Hyde Park & Woodhouse and Headingley wards. City & Hunslet also became Hunslet & Riverside. Following the example of previous reviews, all of the city's councillors were re-elected together again based on the new ward boundaries in May 2018.

Controversy

In September 2012 the Council announced its intention to introduce a bring your own device policy as part of cost saving measures. In the same year, the Council was fined £95,000 by the Information Commissioner's Office (ICO) after it sent confidential and sensitive information about a child in care to the wrong recipient. Commenting on Leeds and other authorities who had made similar data protection breaches, the ICO said "It would be far too easy to consider these breaches as simple human error. The reality is that they are caused by councils treating sensitive personal data in the same routine way they would deal with more general correspondence. Far too often in these cases, the councils do not appear to have acknowledged that the data they are handling is about real people, and often the more vulnerable members of society."

Notes

Citations 

Local government in Leeds
Metropolitan district councils of England
Local education authorities in England
Local authorities in West Yorkshire
Billing authorities in England
Leader and cabinet executives
1974 establishments in England